Minnesota's 4th congressional district covers nearly all of Ramsey County, and part of Washington County. It includes all of St. Paul, and most of its northern and eastern suburbs. The district is solidly Democratic, with a CPVI of D+14. It is currently represented by Betty McCollum, of the Minnesota Democratic-Farmer-Labor Party (DFL). The DFL has held the seat without interruption since 1949, and all but one term (1947-1949) since the merger of the Democratic and Farmer-Labor Parties.

List of members representing the district

Elections

Election results from recent statewide races

Statewide election voting

Historical district boundaries

See also

Minnesota's congressional districts
List of United States congressional districts

References

04